The All-Ireland Senior B Hurling Championship of 1983 was the tenth staging of Ireland's secondary hurling knock-out competition.  Kerry won the championship, beating London 2-8 to 1-7 in the final at Austin Stack Park, Tralee.

References

 Donegan, Des, The Complete Handbook of Gaelic Games (DBA Publications Limited, 2005).

1983
B